Van Heumen is a Dutch surname. Notable people with the surname include:

Gijs van Heumen (born 1952), Dutch field hockey coach
Harrie van Heumen (born 1959), Dutch ice hockey player
Wim van Heumen (1928–1992), Dutch field hockey coach

Dutch-language surnames
Surnames of Dutch origin